Amargo destino Is a film that stars Roberto Guinar and Lorena Herrera and is directed by Roberto Guinar.

Cast
 Roberto Guinar
 Lorena Herrera
 Guillermo Inclán
 Abril Campillo
 Queta Lavat
 Charito Guinar
 José Loza
 Enrique Márquez
 Francisco Garduño
 Marcelo López
 Manuel Cepeda
 Cheryl Mackey
 Marco Bacuzzi
 Rafael Estrada
 José L. Sanabria
 Carmen Navarrete
 Armando Cruz

References

External links
 

1993 films
1993 comedy-drama films
1990s Spanish-language films
Mexican comedy-drama films
1990s Mexican films